The Wolf Prize in Agriculture is awarded annually by the Wolf Foundation in Israel. It is one of the six Wolf Prizes established by the Foundation and awarded since 1978; the others are in Chemistry, Mathematics, Medicine, Physics and the Arts. The Prize is sometimes considered the equivalent of a "Nobel Prize in Agriculture".

Laureates

Laureates per country 
Below is a chart of all laureates per country (updated to 2023 laureates). Some laureates are counted more than once if have multiple citizenship.

See also

 List of agriculture awards

Notes and references

External links 
 
 
 Wolf Prizes 2015
 Wolf Prizes 2016
 Wolf Prizes 2018
 Wolf Prizes 2019

Agriculture awards
Agriculture in society
Agriculture
Lists of Israeli award winners
Awards established in 1978
Israeli science and technology awards
1978 establishments in Israel